Rao Bahadur Dhanakoti Mudaliar or Arcot Dhanakoti Mudaliar  was a  Zamindar, Philanthropist, and Businessman at the Madras Presidency in the later 19th Century.

Mudaliar
He was born into a wealthy family in 1852, and belongs to the dominating and largest land owning Vanniyar family. He was ventured into Military and Railway Contracting, which grow as a Contracting Empire in Madras City. He was also a Member of Madras Municipal Corporation in 1885. His nephew, A. Thangavelu Naicker, was also a contractor.

Philanthropy
He bequeathed his assets to many libraries and educational institutions. He donated to the Victoria Memorial for the purchase of books, which were housed in the Connemara Public Library, and also made several contributions to other causes.

Other Activities
Mudaliar was a member of the council in the Gyan Samaj, a carantic music Sabha, also considered as the mother of other Sabhas in Madras. He joined along with Sir Pitty Tyagaraya Chetty and he was also one of the first executives in the council of The Victoria Technical Institute.

See also
Chengalvaraya Naicker
Kandasamy Kandar

References

History of Chennai
Indian philanthropists
1852 births
Year of death missing